Masin is an island located in the Oriental Mindoro province of the Philippines.

See also

 List of islands of the Philippines

References

Islands of Oriental Mindoro